The 2021 Bowls England National Finals are a series of lawn bowls events to determine the National champions of England. The Championships were held from 19 August to 19 September 2021, at the Royal Leamington Spa Bowls Club in Victoria Park, Leamington Spa. They are organised by Bowls England, and are open to lawn bowlers who qualify via their County Championships. The 2021 finals were streamed live for the first time on YouTube. The National Finals had been cancelled in 2020 due to the COVID-19 pandemic''

Sam Tolchard won his sixth and seventh men's national championship title after winning the men's singles and two wood singles. His sister Sophie Tolchard won her eighth national title when winning the triples with Harriet Stevens and Emma Cooper. Stef Branfield emulated Sam Tolchard in claiming two singles titles at the Championships, the bowler from the Clevedon club (made famous by the legendary David Bryant) won the singles and followed it with the two wood singles a few days later. Branfield nearly made history by winning the champion of champion title as well but lost in the final to Ellen Falkner MBE.

In the women's pairs, sisters Katy Smith and Lucy Smith scored 4 points on the last end to overcome a 3 point deficit to defeat Margaret Smith & Sharmishta Patel.

Results summary

Elite events

Other events

Team events

References

Bowls in England
2021 in English sport
August 2021 sports events in the United Kingdom
September 2021 sports events in the United Kingdom